Guaynabo Fluminense Futbol Club is an Association Football club from Guaynabo, Puerto Rico. The team was a  founding member of the Puerto Rico Soccer League. The club is affiliated with Fluminense Football Club, a leading team from Brazil. The team's kit is similar to the ones used by their Brazilian counterpart.

History

Puerto Rico Soccer League
2008 Season
Guaynabo Fluminense debuted on July 6, 2008, in a game against Gigantes de Carolina, which concluded with both teams tied 2-2. On its second game, the team tied again, this time against Caguas Huracán, with neither team scoring a goal. In their third outing, the team continued this pattern, tying against Club Atletico River Plate Puerto Rico. Guaynabo Fluminense FC lost to Academia Quintana in their fourth game. On the fifth date of the tournament the team tied with Atléticos de San Juan, with both teams scoring four goals a piece. On August 10, 2008, Fluminense registered its fifth draw, against Sevilla FC. This marked the end of the league's first half, the teams would then compete against each other a second time. In the first two games of this stage, Fluminense defeated Tornados de Humacao and Carolina Giants. To close the regular season, the team won 2, lost 1 and tied 2 games.

2009 Season
Guaynabo Fluminense FC started the 2009 season with a 2-0 loss to  Atlético de San Juan FC.

lost 4-1 to Bayamon FC.Finishing seventh in the league table and missing the play off.

Club hierarchy

Guaynabo Fluminense  Ltd.

Chairman: José L. Pacheco

Guaynabo Fluminense plc.

Vice President : José L. Pacheco

Club treasure  : Moisés Blanco

Club Secretary : Diego Montoya

Current squad

References

External links
 Guaynabo Fluminense at Puerto Rico FA website

Association football clubs established in 2002
Fluminense FC
Football clubs in Puerto Rico
Puerto Rico Soccer League teams
2002 establishments in Puerto Rico